Freedom's Way National Heritage Area is a federally designated National Heritage Area encompassing portions of northern Massachusetts and southern New Hampshire. The heritage area includes sites significant to the American Revolution, cultural sites associated with Ralph Waldo Emerson and Henry David Thoreau, and Native American sites.  The heritage area seeks to preserve the region's landscape and historic structures.

The National Heritage Area includes Minute Man National Historical Park, portions of Middlesex and Worcester counties in Massachusetts, and portions of Hillsborough County, New Hampshire, an area including a total of 45 communities in the two states. The designated area also includes portions of Great Meadows National Wildlife Refuge.

Freedom's Way National Heritage Area was established by the Omnibus Public Land Management Act of 2009.

References

External links
 Freedom's Way National Heritage Area website

National Heritage Areas of the United States
Protected areas established in 2009
2009 establishments in Massachusetts
2009 establishments in New Hampshire
Protected areas of Middlesex County, Massachusetts
Protected areas of Worcester County, Massachusetts
Protected areas of Hillsborough County, New Hampshire
Minute Man National Historical Park
American Revolutionary War sites in Massachusetts
American Revolutionary War sites